Mamma Mia! Here We Go Again: The Movie Soundtrack is the soundtrack album for the 2018 musical film Mamma Mia! Here We Go Again. It is a follow-up to the 2008 film Mamma Mia!, which in turn is based on the 1999 West End/Broadway musical of the same name. It was released on July 13, 2018, by Capitol and Polydor Records in the United States and internationally, respectively. The album was produced by Benny Andersson, who also served as the album's executive producer alongside Björn Ulvaeus and Judy Craymer. Cher's vocals were produced by Mark Taylor, with her being the only singer on that album to have a different producer for the vocals. Commercially, the album has peaked at number three on the Billboard 200 and at number one in the United Kingdom, Ireland, Finland, New Zealand, Australia, Austria, Greece and Scotland.

Track listing

Commercial performance
In the United States, the soundtrack sold 19,000 copies in its first week of release and debuted at number 20 on the Billboard 200. In its second week, it ascended to number three with 48,000 album-equivalent units (including 34,000 pure album sales). In the United Kingdom, the album debuted at number four and rose to number one the following week, selling 35,000 copies to reach the top.

Charts

Weekly charts

Year-end charts

Certifications and sales

References

2018 soundtrack albums
Mamma Mia!
Musical film soundtracks
Comedy film soundtracks
Romance film soundtracks
ABBA tribute albums